The wild horse (Equus ferus) is a species of the genus Equus, which includes as subspecies the modern domesticated horse (Equus ferus caballus) as well as the endangered Przewalski's horse (Equus ferus przewalskii). The European wild horse, also known as the tarpan, that went extinct in the late 19th or early 20th century has previously been classified as a subspecies of wild horse  (Equus ferus ferus), but more recent studies have cast doubt on whether those horses were truly wild or if they actually were feral horses or hybrids.

Przewalski's horse had reached the brink of extinction, but was reintroduced successfully into the wild. The tarpan became extinct in the 19th century, but is theorized to have been present on the steppes of Eurasia at the time of domestication. However, other subspecies of Equus ferus may have existed and could have been the stock from which domesticated horses are descended. Since the extinction of the tarpan, attempts have been made to reconstruct its phenotype using domestic horses, resulting in horse breeds such as the Heck horse. However, the genetic makeup and foundation bloodstock of those breeds is substantially derived from domesticated horses, so these breeds possess domesticated traits.

The term "wild horse" is also used colloquially in reference to free-roaming herds of feral horses; for example, the mustang in the United States, and the brumby in Australia. These feral horses are untamed members of the domestic horse subspecies (Equus ferus caballus), not to be confused with the truly "wild" horse subspecies extant into modern times.

Distribution 
Evidence supports E. ferus as having evolved in North America about 1.1 - 1.2 million years ago.  Around 800,000 - 900,000 years ago, E. ferus migrated west to Eurasia via the Bering Land Bridge, and south to South America via the Isthmus of Panama as part of the Great American Interchange. By the mid-late Pleistocene, it had an extremely large range across the Americas, Eurasia, and North Africa, across which it was abundant. There have been several fossil horse taxa from throughout this range, such as Equus lambei and Amerhippus, that were formerly considered distinct species, but genetic and morphological analysis supports them as being conspecific with E. ferus.

By the latest Pleistocene or early Holocene, American populations had disappeared as part of the Quaternary extinction event, leaving only the Old World populations. It remained widespread there and was ultimately also domesticated around 3600 B.C., but wild populations continued to decline. The last completely wild populations of the tarpan went extinct in Eastern Europe and the southern parts of Russia around the late 19th century, and Przewalski's horse of Central Asia became extinct in the wild in 1969. However, over the past few centuries feral horses have been introduced to all continents except Antarctica, and Przewalski's horses have been reintroduced to their former habitats in Mongolia.

Ecology

In general, wild horses are grazers that prefer to inhabit open areas, such as steppes and grasslands. They may have seasonal food preferences, as seen in the Przewalski's subspecies. Horses may fall prey to native predators where they live, such as wolves, cougars, and spotted hyenas.

Subspecies and their history
E. ferus has had several subspecies, only three of which have survived into modern times:
The domestic horse (Equus ferus caballus).
The Eurasian wild horse (Equus ferus ferus); originally considered synonymous with the tarpan, though recent research has cast doubt on this. The tarpan was once native to Europe and western Asia before it became effectively extinct in the late 19th century. The last specimen died in 1909 whilst in captivity in an estate in Poltava Governorate, Russian Empire.
Przewalski's horse (Equus ferus przewalskii); also known as the Mongolian wild horse or takhi, it is native to Central Asia and the Gobi Desert.
The latter two are the only never-domesticated "wild" groups that survived into historic times. However, other subspecies of Equus ferus may have existed.

In the Late Pleistocene epoch, there were several other subspecies of E.ferus which have all since gone extinct. The exact categorization of Equus''' remains into species or subspecies is a complex matter and the subject of ongoing work.

Evolutionary history and taxonomy
 

The horse family Equidae and the genus Equus evolved in North America during the Pliocene, before the species migrated across Beringia into the Eastern Hemisphere. Studies using ancient DNA, as well as DNA of recent individuals, suggest the presence of two equine species in Late Pleistocene North America, a caballine species, suggested to be conspecific with the wild horse, and Haringtonhippus francisci, the "New World stilt-legged horse"; the latter has been taxonomically assigned to various names, and appears to be outside the grouping containing all extant equines. In South America there appear to have been several species of equine, Equus (Amerhippus) neogeus, which had previously thought to represent 5 taxa due to morphological variability, and several species of Hippidion, which also lie outside the group containing all living horses. (It had previously been suggested to have been nested within Equus based on incomplete sequence data)

Currently, three subspecies that lived during recorded human history are recognized. One subspecies is the widespread domestic horse (Equus ferus caballus), as well as two wild subspecies: the recently extinct European wild horse (E. f. ferus) and the endangered Przewalski's horse (E. f. przewalskii).

Genetically, the pre-domestication horse, E. f. ferus, and the domesticated horse, E. f. caballus, form a single homogeneous group (clade) and are genetically indistinguishable from each other. The genetic variation within this clade shows only a limited regional variation, with the notable exception of Przewalski's horse. Przewalski's horse has several unique genetic differences that distinguish it from the other subspecies, including 66 instead of 64 chromosomes, unique Y-chromosome gene haplotypes, and unique mtDNA haplotypes.

Besides genetic differences, osteological evidence from across the Eurasian wild horse range, based on cranial and metacarpal differences, indicates the presence of only two subspecies in postglacial times, the tarpan and Przewalski's horse.

Scientific naming of the species
At present, the domesticated and wild horses are considered a single species, with the valid scientific name for the horse species being Equus ferus. The wild tarpan subspecies is E. f. ferus, Przewalski's horse is E. f. przewalskii, and the domesticated horse is E. f. caballus. The rules for the scientific naming of animal species are determined in the International Code of Zoological Nomenclature, which stipulates that the oldest available valid scientific name is used to name the species. Previously, when taxonomists considered domesticated and wild horse two subspecies of the same species, the valid scientific name was Equus caballus Linnaeus 1758, with the subspecies labeled E. c. caballus (domesticated horse), E. c. ferus Boddaert, 1785 (tarpan) and E. c. przewalskii Poliakov, 1881 (Przewalski's horse). However, in 2003, the International Commission on Zoological Nomenclature decided that the scientific names of the wild species have priority over the scientific names of domesticated species, therefore mandating the use of Equus ferus'' for the horse, independent of the position of the domesticated horse.

Przewalski's horse
      
Przewalski's horse occupied the eastern Eurasian Steppes, perhaps from the Urals to Mongolia, although the ancient border between tarpan and Przewalski's distributions has not been clearly defined. Przewalski's horse was limited to Dzungaria and western Mongolia in the same period, and became extinct in the wild during the 1960s, but was reintroduced in the late 1980s to two preserves in Mongolia. Although researchers such as Marija Gimbutas theorized that the horses of the Chalcolithic period were Przewalski's, more recent genetic studies indicate that Przewalski's horse is not an ancestor to modern domesticated horses. 

In 2018, a DNA study revealed that the horses belonging to the Botai culture were Przewalski's horses, raising the question of whether these animals were an isolated population, if extant Przewalski horses today represent feral descendants, or if the domestication attempt at Botai failed.  A 2021 study argued that the Botai horses were most likely not domesticated, thus the question remains unresolved.

Przewalski's horse is still found today, though it is an endangered species and for a time was considered extinct in the wild. Roughly 2000 Przewalski's horses are in zoos around the world. A small breeding population has been reintroduced in Mongolia. As of 2005, a cooperative venture between the Zoological Society of London and Mongolian scientists has resulted in a population of 248 animals in the wild.

Przewalski's horse has some biological differences from the domestic horse; unlike domesticated horses and the tarpan, which both have 64 chromosomes, Przewalski's horse has 66 chromosomes due to a Robertsonian translocation. However, the offspring of Przewalski and domestic horses are fertile, possessing 65 chromosomes.

Feral horses

Horses that live in an untamed state but have ancestors that have been domesticated are called "feral horses". For instance, when the Spanish reintroduced the horse to the Americas, beginning in the late 15th century, some horses escaped, forming feral herds; the best-known being the mustang. Similarly, the brumby descended from horses strayed or let loose in Australia by English settlers. Isolated populations of feral horses occur in a number of places, including Bosnia, Croatia, New Zealand, Portugal, Scotland and a number of barrier islands along the Atlantic coast of North America from Sable Island off Nova Scotia, to Cumberland Island, off the coast of Georgia. Even though these are often referred to as "wild" horses, they are not truly "wild" if wildness is defined as having no domesticated ancestors.

In 1995, British and French explorers encountered a new population of horses in the Riwoche Valley of Tibet, unknown to the rest of the world, but apparently used by the local Khamba people. It was speculated that the Riwoche horse might be a relict population of wild horses, but testing did not reveal genetic differences with domesticated horses, which is in line with news reports indicating that they are used as pack and riding animals by the local villagers.

See also
Horse behavior
Domestication of the horse

References

Citations

Bibliography

 Equid Specialist Group 1996. Equus ferus. In: IUCN 2006. 2006 IUCN Red List of Threatened Species. <www.iucnredlist.org>.
 Moelman, P.D. 2002. Equids. Zebras, Asses and Horses. Status Survey and Conservation Action Plan. IUCN/SSC Equid Specialist Group. IUCN, Gland, Switzerland.
 

Equus (genus)
Mammals described in 1785
Types of horse